Simon Magus (Greek Σίμων ὁ μάγος, Latin: Simon Magus), also known as Simon the Sorcerer or Simon the Magician, was a religious figure whose confrontation with Peter is recorded in Acts. The act of simony, or paying for position, is named after Simon who tried to buy his way into the power of the Apostles.

According to Acts, Simon was a Samaritan magus or religious figure of the 1st century AD and a convert to Christianity, baptised by Philip the Evangelist. Simon later clashed with Peter. Accounts of Simon by writers of the second century exist, but are not considered verifiable. Surviving traditions about Simon appear in orthodox texts, such as those of Irenaeus, Justin Martyr, Hippolytus, and Epiphanius, where he is often described as the founder of Gnosticism, which has been accepted by some modern scholars,  while others reject that he was a Gnostic, just designated as one by the Church Fathers.

Justin, who was himself a 2nd-century native of Samaria, wrote that nearly all the Samaritans in his time were adherents of a certain Simon of Gitta, a village not far from Flavia Neapolis. Irenaeus held him as being the founder of the sect of the Simonians. Hippolytus quotes from a work he attributes to Simon or his followers the Simonians, Apophasis Megale, or Great Declaration. According to the early church heresiologists, Simon is also supposed to have written several lost treatises, two of which bear the titles The Four Quarters of the World and The Sermons of the Refuter.

In apocryphal works including the Acts of Peter, Pseudo-Clementines, and the Epistle of the Apostles, Simon also appears as a formidable sorcerer with the ability to levitate and fly at will. He is sometimes referred to as "the Bad Samaritan" due to his malevolent character. The Apostolic Constitutions also accuses him of "lawlessness" (antinomianism).

History

Acts of the Apostles

The canonical Acts of the Apostles features a short narrative about Simon Magus; this is his only appearance in the New Testament.

Josephus
Josephus mentions a magician named [Atomus] (Simon in Latin manuscripts) as being involved with the procurator Felix, King Agrippa II and his sister Drusilla, where Felix has Simon convince Drusilla to marry him instead of the man she was engaged to. Some scholars have considered the two to be identical, although this is not generally accepted, as the Simon of Josephus is a Jew rather than a Samaritan.

Justin Martyr and Irenaeus
Justin Martyr (in his Apologies, and in a lost work against heresies, which Irenaeus used as his main source) and Irenaeus (Adversus Haereses) record that after being cast out by the Apostles, Simon Magus came to Rome where, having joined to himself a profligate woman of the name of Helen, he gave out that it was he who appeared among the Jews as the Son, in Samaria as the Father and among other nations as the Holy Spirit.  He performed such signs by magic acts during the reign of Claudius that he was regarded as a god and honored with a statue on the island in the Tiber which the two bridges cross, with the inscription Simoni Deo Sancto, "To Simon the Holy God" (First Apology, XXVI). However, in the 16th century, a statue was unearthed on the island in question, inscribed to Semo Sancus, a Sabine deity, leading some scholars to believe that Justin Martyr confused Semoni Sancus with Simon.

Myth of Simon and Helen
Justin and Irenaeus are the first to recount the myth of Simon and Helen, which became the center of Simonian doctrine. Epiphanius of Salamis also makes Simon speak in the first person in several places in his Panarion, and the implication is that he is quoting from a version of it, though perhaps not verbatim.

As described by Epiphanius, in the beginning God had his first thought, his Ennoia, which was female, and that thought was to create the angels. The First Thought then descended into the lower regions and created the angels. But the angels rebelled against her out of jealousy and created the world as her prison, imprisoning her in a female body. Thereafter, she was reincarnated many times, each time being shamed. Her many reincarnations included Helen of Troy, among others, and she finally was reincarnated as Helen, a slave and prostitute in the Phoenician city of Tyre. God then descended in the form of Simon Magus, to rescue his Ennoia, and to confer salvation upon men through knowledge of himself.

For as the angels were mismanaging the world, owing to their individual lust for rule, he had come to set things straight, and had descended under a changed form, likening himself to the Principalities and Powers through whom he passed, so that among men he appeared as a man, though he was not a man, and was thought to have suffered in Judaea, though he had not suffered.

But the prophets had delivered their prophecies under the inspiration of the world-creating angels: wherefore those who had their hope in him and in Helen minded them no more, and, as being free, did what they pleased; for men were saved according to his grace, but not according to just works. For works were not just by nature, but only by convention, in accordance with the enactments of the world-creating angels, who by precepts of this kind sought to bring men into slavery. Wherefore he promised that the world should be dissolved, and that those who were his should be freed from the dominion of the world-creators.

In this account of Simon there is a large portion common to almost all forms of Gnostic myths, together with something special to this form. They have in common the place in the work of creation assigned to the female principle, the conception of the Deity; the ignorance of the rulers of this lower world with regard to the Supreme Power; the descent of the female (Sophia) into the lower regions, and her inability to return. Special to the Simonian tale is the identification of Simon himself with the Supreme, and of his consort Helena with the female principle.

Hippolytus
In Philosophumena, Hippolytus retells the narrative on Simon written by Irenaeus (who in his turn based it on the lost Syntagma of Justin). Upon the story of "the lost sheep," Hippolytus comments as follows:

Also, Hippolytus demonstrates acquaintance with the folk tradition on Simon which depicts him rather as a magician than Gnostic, and in constant conflict with Peter (also present in the apocrypha and Pseudo-Clementine literature). Reduced to despair by the curse laid upon him by Peter in the Acts, Simon soon abjured the faith and embarked on the career of a sorcerer:

Simonians

Hippolytus gives a much more doctrinally detailed account of Simonianism, including a system of divine emanations and interpretations of the Old Testament, with extensive quotations from the Apophasis Megale. Some believe that Hippolytus' account is of a later, more developed form of Simonianism, and that the original doctrines of the group were simpler, close to the account given by Justin Martyr and Irenaeus (this account however is also included in Hippolytus' work).

Hippolytus says the free love doctrine was held by them in its purest form, and speaks in language similar to that of Irenaeus about the variety of magic arts practiced by the Simonians, and also of their having images of Simon and Helen under the forms of Zeus and Athena. But he also adds, "if any one, on seeing the images either of Simon or Helen, shall call them by those names, he is cast out, as showing ignorance of the mysteries."

Epiphanius
Epiphanius writes that there were some Simonians still in existence in his day (c. AD 367), but he speaks of them as almost extinct. Gitta, he says, had sunk from a town into a village. He tells us also that he gave barbaric names to the "principalities and powers," and that he was the beginning of the Gnostics. The Law, according to him, was not of God, but of "the sinister power." The same was the case with the prophets, and it was death to believe in the Old Testament.

Cyril of Jerusalem

Cyril of Jerusalem (346 AD) in the sixth of his Catechetical Lectures prefaces his history of the Manichaeans by a brief account of earlier heresies: Simon Magus, he says, had given out that he was going to be translated to heaven, and was actually careening through the air in a chariot drawn by demons when Peter and Paul knelt down and prayed, and their prayers brought him to earth a mangled corpse.

Apocrypha

Acts of Peter
The apocryphal Acts of Peter gives a more elaborate tale of Simon Magus' death. Simon is performing magic in the Forum, and in order to prove himself to be a god, he levitates up into the air above the Forum.  The apostle Peter prays to God to stop his flying, and he stops mid-air and falls into a place called "the Sacra Via" (meaning "Holy Way" in Latin), breaking his legs "in three parts". The previously non-hostile crowd then stones him. Now gravely injured, he had some people carry him on a bed at night from Rome to Ariccia, and was brought from there to Terracina to a person named Castor, who on accusations of sorcery was banished from Rome. The Acts then continue to say that he died "while being sorely cut by two physicians".

Acts of Peter and Paul
Another apocryphal document, the Acts of Peter and Paul gives a slightly different version of the above incident, which was shown in the context of a debate in front of the Emperor Nero. In this version, Paul the Apostle is present along with Peter, Simon levitates from a high wooden tower made upon his request, and dies "divided into four parts" due to the fall. Peter and Paul were then put in prison by Nero while ordering Simon's body be kept carefully for three days (thinking he would rise again).

Pseudo-Clementine literature
The Pseudo-Clementine Recognitions and Homilies give an account of Simon Magus and some of his teachings in regards to the Simonians. They are of uncertain date and authorship, and seem to have been worked over by several hands in the interest of diverse forms of belief.

Simon was a Samaritan, and a native of Gitta. The name of his father was Antonius, that of his mother Rachel. He studied Greek literature in Alexandria, and, having in addition to this great power in magic, became so ambitious that he wished to be considered a highest power, higher even than the God who created the world. And sometimes he "darkly hinted" that he himself was Christ, calling himself the Standing One. Which name he used to indicate that he would stand for ever, and had no cause in him for bodily decay. He did not believe that the God who created the world was the highest, nor that the dead would rise. He denied Jerusalem, and introduced Mount Gerizim in its stead. In place of the Christ of the Christians he proclaimed himself; and the Law he allegorized in accordance with his own preconceptions. He did indeed preach righteousness and judgment to come.

There was one John the Baptist, who was the forerunner of Jesus in accordance with the law of parity; and as Jesus had twelve Apostles, bearing the number of the twelve solar months, so had he thirty leading men, making up the monthly tale of the moon. One of these thirty leading men was a woman called Helen, and the first and most esteemed by John was Simon. But on the death of John he was away in Egypt for the practice of magic, and one Dositheus, by spreading a false report of Simon's death, succeeded in installing himself as head of the sect. Simon on coming back thought it better to dissemble, and, pretending friendship for Dositheus, accepted the second place. Soon, however, he began to hint to the thirty that Dositheus was not as well acquainted as he might be with the doctrines of the school.

The encounter between Dositheus and Simon Magus was the beginnings of the sect of Simonians. The narrative goes on to say that Simon, having fallen in love with Helen, took her about with him, saying that she had come down into the world from the highest heavens, and was his mistress, inasmuch as she was Sophia, the Mother of All. It was for her sake, he said, that the Greeks and Barbarians fought the Trojan War, deluding themselves with an image of truth, for the real being was then present with the First God. By such allegories Simon deceived many, while at the same time he astounded them by his magic. A description is given of how he made a familiar spirit for himself by conjuring the soul out of a boy and keeping his image in his bedroom, and many instances of his feats of magic are given.

Anti-Paulinism

The Pseudo-Clementine writings were used in the 4th century by members of the Ebionite sect, one characteristic of which was hostility to Paul, whom they refused to recognize as an apostle. Ferdinand Christian Baur (1792–1860), founder of the Tübingen School, drew attention to the anti-Pauline characteristic in the Pseudo-Clementines, and pointed out that in the disputations between Simon and Peter, some of the claims Simon is represented as making (e.g. that of having seen the Lord, though not in his lifetime, yet subsequently in vision) were really the claims of Paul; and urged that Peter's refutation of Simon was in some places intended as a polemic against Paul. The enmity between Peter and Simon is clearly shown. Simon's magical powers are juxtaposed with Peter's powers in order to express Peter's authority over Simon through the power of prayer, and in the 17th Homily, the identification of Paul with Simon Magus is effected. Simon is there made to maintain that he has a better knowledge of the mind of Jesus than the disciples, who had seen and conversed with Jesus in person. His reason for this strange assertion is that visions are superior to waking reality, as divine is superior to human. Peter has much to say in reply to this, but the passage which mainly concerns us is as follows:

The anti-Pauline context of the Pseudo-Clementines is recognised, but the association with Simon Magus is surprising, according to Jozef Verheyden, since they have little in common. However the majority of scholars accept Baur's identification, though others, including Lightfoot, argued extensively that the "Simon Magus" of the Pseudo-Clementines was not meant to stand for Paul. More recently, Berlin pastor Hermann Detering (1995) has made the case that the veiled anti-Pauline stance of the Pseudo-Clementines has historical roots, that the Acts 8 encounter between Simon the magician and Peter is itself based on the conflict between Peter and Paul. Detering's belief has not found general support among scholars, but Robert M. Price argues much the same case in The Amazing Colossal Apostle:The Search for the Historical Paul (2012).

Anti-Marcionism
There are other features in the portrait which are reminiscent of Marcion. The first thing mentioned in the Homilies about Simon's opinions is that he denied that God was just.
By "God" he meant the creator god. But he undertakes to prove from the Jewish scriptures that there is a higher god, who really possesses the perfections which are falsely ascribed to the lower god.
On these grounds Peter complains that, when he was setting out for the gentiles to convert them from their worship of many gods upon earth, Satan had sent Simon before him to make them believe that there were many gods in heaven.

Druidism 
In Irish legend Simon Magus came to be associated with Druidism.  He is said to have come to the aid of the Druid Mog Ruith.  The fierce denunciation of Christianity by Irish Druids appears to have resulted in Simon Magus being associated with Druidism.  The word Druid was sometimes translated into Latin as magus, and Simon Magus was also known in Ireland as "Simon the Druid".

Medieval legends, later interpretations
The church of Santa Francesca Romana, Rome, is claimed to have been built on the spot where Simon fell. Within the Church is a dented slab of marble that purports to bear the imprints of the knees of Peter and Paul during their prayer. The fantastic stories of Simon the Sorcerer persisted into the later Middle Ages, becoming a possible inspiration for the Faustbuch  and Goethe's Faust.

The opening story in Danilo Kiš's 1983 collection The Encyclopedia of the Dead, "Simon Magus", retells the confrontation between Simon and Peter agreeing with the account in the Acts of Peter, and provides an additional alternative ending in which Simon asks to be buried alive in order to be resurrected three days later (after which his body is found putrefied).

See also 
 Apollonius of Tyana
 Jesus of Nazareth
 John the Baptist
 List of messiah claimants
 List of people who have claimed to be Jesus
 Saints and levitation
 Simon Magus in popular culture 
 Elymas Bar-Jesus

References

Bibliography

 
 
 
 
 
 
 .
 
 
 
 
 .
 .

External links
 

1st-century Romans
Ancient Christians involved in controversies
Christian occultists
Deal with the Devil
Simon the Magus
People in Acts of the Apostles
Saint Peter
Samaritan culture and history
Simony
Tribe of Dan
1st-century people
Flight folklore
Magi
Simon Magus